The 2003 Elite League speedway season was the 69th season of the top division of speedway in the United Kingdom and governed by the Speedway Control Bureau (SCB), in conjunction with the British Speedway Promoters' Association (BSPA).

Season summary
In 2003, the league decreased to eight teams, after the King's Lynn dropped to the Premier League and reverted back to their traditional name of Stars. They also lost the promotion of Nigel Wagstaff who took over at Oxford, which resulted in Oxford Cheetahs taking over the Silver Machine name from King's Lynn. King's Lynn's leading riders Nicki Pedersen and Sebastian Ułamek also switched to Oxford. Freddie Eriksson went to Ipswich. Oxford also brought in former World Champion Greg Hancock from Coventry but lost Leigh Adams and Lukáš Dryml to Poole.

Poole's decision to recruit Adams and Dryml was instrumental because they went on to claim the title. Adams finished top of the league averages and he was backed up by their five time World Champion Tony Rickardsson and the vastly improved form of Magnus Zetterström. Poole went on to complete the double by winning the Knockout Cup.

Final table

Play-offs
Semi-final decided over one leg. Grand Final decided by aggregate scores over two legs.

Semi-finals
Poole Pirates 48-42 Oxford Silver Machine
Coventry Bees 60-30 Peterborough Panthers

Final

First leg

Second leg

The Poole Pirates were declared League Champions, winning on aggregate 100-79.

Elite League Knockout Cup
The 2003 Elite League Knockout Cup was the 65th edition of the Knockout Cup for tier one teams. Poole Pirates were the winners of the competition.

Quarter-finals

Semi-finals

Final

First leg

Second leg

The Poole Pirates were declared Knockout Cup Champions, winning on aggregate 90-88.

Leading final averages

Riders & final averages
Belle Vue

 10.79
 8.24
 7.93
	6.78
 6.52
 6.21
 5.23
 5.15
 4.79
 4.78
 4.31
 2.67
	 2.46

Coventry

 9.23 
 8.78
 8.49
7.72
 6.84
 5.97
 3.71
 3.27
 2.82

Eastbourne

 8.48
 8.08
 8.05
 7.83
 7.81
 7.44 
 7.36 
 5.89
 5.70
 5.08
 4.00
 4.00
 2.67

Ipswich

 9.41
 6.53
 6.46
  5.93
 5.93
 5.91
 5.60
 5.47
 4.83
 4.70
 4.07
 4.00

Oxford

 9.33
 9.28
 8.64 
 7.82
 7.81
 6.52
 6.43
 6.37
 6.30
 5.57
 4.84
 4.77
 4.46
 2.72

Peterborough

 9.23
 8.76
 7.28
 7.22
 6.97
 6.93
 6.23
 5.86

Poole

 10.14
 10.07
 9.64
 8.52
 7.66
 7.20
 7.06
 6.48
 6.10
 5.83
 4.55
 4.33

Wolverhampton

 9.28
 9.10
 7.45
 7.40
 7.02
 7.01
 6.57
 6.00
 5.80
 5.67
 4.88
 2.95

See also
 Speedway in the United Kingdom
 List of United Kingdom Speedway League Champions
 Knockout Cup (speedway)

References

SGB Premiership
2003 in British motorsport